Olivier Monterrubio (born 8 August 1976) is a French former professional footballer who played as a midfielder. He played for FC Nantes, Stade Rennais, RC Lens, FC Sion in Switzerland, and FC Lorient.

Club career

Nantes
Monterrubio started his professional career at Nantes in 1996. Product of the famed "Centre of Formation" of Nantes, he was in the same crop of players such as Mickaël Landreau. He was an essential part of the squad in the 1998–99 season, and his winning penalty handed Nantes the Coupe de France title in 1999. He also scored the winning goal in the 1999 Trophée des Champions and played as a substitute when Nantes won the 2000 Coupe de France Final. Finally, in 2001, Monterrubio became a Ligue 1 winner with Les Canaries.

Stade Rennais
In the summer of 2001, Monterrubio signed for fierce rivals Stade Rennais. Despite having a quiet start to his spell at the club, he became one of their key players, establishing a deadly partnership with Swiss striker Alexander Frei. In the 2004–05 season, he led Ligue 1 in assists while Frei was the top scorer. Such was his influence, that he has inherited the captain's armband from Cyril Jeunechamp.

Lens
In the last few hours of the January 2007 transfer window, Monterrubio signed for RC Lens as a replacement for Olivier Thomert, who moved in the opposite direction. On 3 February 2007, he played his first Ligue 1 match for Lens against Valenciennes. During this period, he had to fight for his first team place with the Ivorian midfielder Kanga Akalé. He struck up a strong partnership with Nadir Belhadj upon the Algerian left-back's arrival at the club in January 2008, but the team were relegated to Ligue 2 at the end of the season despite Monterrubio's fine form.

Sion
Monterrubio signed a two-year contract with Swiss side FC Sion during the summer of 2008.

Lorient
On 28 June 2009, he signed a contract between 30 June 2011 with FC Lorient leaving Sion after one year.

International career
Born in France, Monterrubio is of Spanish descent. In his prime, Monterrubio was among the finest players of his unique kind. Although he did not win a single national team cap, he did receive three call-ups to the France B team, scoring in all 3 of his appearances.

Style
Monterrubio was an accomplished left winger, but had also been featured as a striker and attacking midfielder in the early of his career. He specialized in set-pieces, especially at penalty-taking. He led Ligue 1 in assists in 2004–05 and 2005–06 and was runner-up in 2006–07.

Honours
Nantes
 Ligue 1: 2000–01
 Coupe de France: 1998–99, 1999–2000
 Trophée des Champions: 1999

Sion
Swiss Cup: 2008–09

References

External links
 Olivier Monterrubio's profile, stats & pics
 
 

Living people
1976 births
People from Gaillac
Sportspeople from Tarn (department)
Association football wingers
Association football midfielders
French footballers
French people of Spanish descent
French expatriate footballers
FC Nantes players
Stade Rennais F.C. players
RC Lens players
FC Sion players
FC Lorient players
Ligue 1 players
Swiss Super League players
Expatriate footballers in Switzerland
Footballers from Occitania (administrative region)